Religion in Colombia is dominated by various branches of Christianity and is an expression of the different cultural heritages in the Colombian culture including the Spanish colonization, the Native Amerindian and the Afro-Colombian, among others.

Colombia is a secular country and the freedom of religion is enshrined in the nation's constitution. The Ministry of Interior is responsible for formally recognizing churches, religious denominations, religious federations and confederations, and associations of religious ministers.

Religious freedom
The Colombian Constitution of 1991 disestablished the Roman Catholic Church, hitherto the state religion, and includes two articles providing for freedom of worship:
 Article 13 states that "all people are legally born free and equal" and are not to be subjected to discrimination because of their "sex, race, national or familial origin, language, religion, political or philosophical opinion";
 Article 19 expressly guarantees freedom of religion: "Freedom of religion is guaranteed. Every person has the right to freely profess his religion and to disseminate it individually or collectively. All religious confessions and churches are equally free before the law."

Christianity

Catholic Christianity

 
Christianity  (Catholicism) was the official religion of the country from the Spanish colonization until the 1991 constitutional reform (National Constituent Assembly), which granted egalitarian treatment from the government to all the religions. However, Catholicism is still the main religion in Colombia by number of adherents, with an estimated 90% of the national population in nominal Catholicism, from which about 30% are practicing Catholics.

In the colonial period, the Catholic Church was created and in charge of most of the public institutions, such as teaching facilities (schools, colleges, universities, libraries, botanical gardens, astronomical observatories); health facilities (Hospitals, nurseries, leper hospitals) and jails. It also "inherited" a huge amount of land, approx. 1/4 of all the productive land, which was later acquired by the government.

Colombia is often referred as the "Country of the Sacred Heart", due to the annual consecration of the country to the Sacred Heart of Jesus in a Te Deum directed by the president of the republic. Colombia has been re-consecrated to the Sacred Heart of Jesus and consecrated to the Immaculate Heart of Mary in 2008, in a country-wide ceremony celebrated by the main bishops and with the presence of the Colombian president (also a Catholic).

Protestant Christianity

Protestantism, primarily Evangelicalism, now represents 13% of the Colombian populace, and is growing faster than the national growth rate. "Evangelicos" (as they are called in Colombia) hold to the authority of the Bible. Many of them belong to Pentecostal churches, but other churches are active as well.

Baháʼí Faith

The Baháʼí Faith in Colombia begins with references to the country in Baháʼí literature as early as 1916, with Baháʼís visiting as early as 1927. The first Colombian joined the religion in 1929 and the first Baháʼí Local Spiritual Assembly was elected in Bogotá in 1944 with the beginning of the arrival of coordinated pioneers from the United States and achieved an independent National Spiritual Assembly in 1961. By 1963 there were eleven local assemblies. In the 1980s institutions were developed in Colombia that have influenced activities inside and independent of the religion in other countries: FUNDAEC and the Ruhi Institute. The Association of Religion Data Archives (relying mostly on the World Christian Encyclopedia) estimated some 68,000 Baháʼís (0.2% of the population) in 2005.

Islam

 
According to a 2018 study conducted Pew Research Center, the size of the Colombian Muslim population ranges from about 85,000–100,000 individuals. There are a number of Islamic organizations in Colombia, including Islamic in San Andrés, Barranquilla, Bogotá, Guajira, Nariño, and Santa Marta. There are also primary and secondary Islamic schools in Bogotá and Maicao. Maicao plays host to the continent's third largest mosque, the Mosque of Omar Ibn Al-Khattab. 

Most Colombian Muslims are converts or of Arab descent.

Other religious affiliations
Various denominations have their own statistics:
 Seventh-day Adventist Church: 270,256 members as of June 30, 2017
 The Church of Jesus Christ of Latter-day Saints: 193,350 members (2016)
 Jehovah's Witnesses: about 165,089 members (2015)
 Baháʼí Faith: about 70,500 (2010)
 Judaism: between 5,000 and 10,000 members
 Buddhism: approximately 9,000

Although the government does not keep official statistics on religious affiliation, a 2010 limited survey found 
 70.0% Catholic
 0.9% Charismatic Catholic
 14.4% Evangelical Christian
 1.6% Pentecostal
 0.3% Charismatic Evangelicals
 0.4% Protestant
 2.5% Agnostic
 2.2% Atheist
 3.5% Theistic but no religion
 1.3% Jehovah's Witnesses
 0.5% Adventist
 0.1% Muslim
 2.2% no response

As of 2013, there seems to be no social controversy or problem arising from religious conflict. Religious discrimination is prohibited by the constitution and there is no official religion; however, the state is also explicitly not supposed to be indifferent to religious sentiments and the Catholic church has a special status. All cities and towns in Colombia have a church, but there are also some temples, mosques and synagogues in the largest cities.

A Colombian-grown Taoist movement has spread significantly in recent years. In the 2000s, temples and congregations were target of a paramilitary repression whose motivations are still unclear. Entire Taoist communities were massacred and leaders kidnapped.  In 2008 Taoist communities organised and participated to various peaceful protests in some cities of Colombia.

Religious statistics 
The National Administrative Department of Statistics (DANE) does not collect religious statistics, and accurate reports are difficult to obtain. However, based on various studies and a survey, about 90% of the population adheres to Christianity, the majority of which (70.9%) are Roman Catholic, while a significant minority (16.7%) adhere to Protestantism (primarily Evangelicalism). Some 4.7% of the population is atheist or agnostic, while 3.5% claim to believe in God but do not follow a specific religion. 1.8% of Colombians adhere to Jehovah's Witnesses and Adventism and less than 1% adhere to other religions, such as Islam, Judaism, Buddhism, Mormonism, Hinduism, Indigenous religions, Hare Krishna movement, Rastafari movement, Eastern Orthodox Church, and spiritual studies. The remaining people either did not respond or replied that they did not know. In addition to the above statistics, 35.9% of Colombians reported that they did not practice their faith actively.

While Colombia remains a mostly Roman Catholic country by baptism numbers, the 1991 Colombian constitution guarantees freedom of religion and all religious faiths and churches are equally free before the law.

Syncretism in Colombia
Some syncretic or native religious figures in the country are: The healing ghost of José Gregorio Hernández, the Purgatory souls (Animas del Purgatorio), the Lonely Soul (Anima Sola), the Powerful hand, the Black Christ of Buga, Valle del Cauca, 20 July Baby Jesus (Divine Infant Jesus), Father Marianito (beatified Mariano de Jesus Euse Hoyos 1845–1926), the fertility rites of St Isidro and local variations of syncretism from other countries, such as Santería and Maria Lionza cult.

Gallery

References